A marotte is a prop stick or sceptre with a carved head on it. Jesters usually used a marotte. The word is borrowed from the French, where it signifies either a fool's (literal) "bauble" or a fad.

Typically carried by a jester or Arlecchino, the miniature head often reflects the costume of the jester who carries it. Modern marottes typically have music boxes or other machinery built into the head. Older marottes may utilize swivel heads with bells.

In popular culture
In the children's TV series Rentaghost, the stick was referred to as a "Tiny Timothy".

In Verdi's opera Rigoletto, the singer of the title role, a jester, carries a marotte, which often has on it the faces of comedy and tragedy.

See also
Cap and bells

Gallery

Regalia
Jesters
Puppets